The Central Avenue Line, designated Route C21, C22, C26, C27, C29, is a daily bus route operated by the Washington Metropolitan Area Transit Authority between Addison Road station (C21, C22, C27, C29) or Downtown Largo station (C26) of the Blue and Silver lines of the Washington Metro, and Bowie Park & Ride Lot (C26), Pointer Ridge (C21, C22, C27, C29), Collington Center (C21, C22 weekday peak hour trips), or Bowie State University (C29, Sat. Only). The line operates every 30–35 minutes during the weekday peak-hours only and 60 minutes at all other times at a combined frequency of 15–30 minutes. Trips roughly take 30 minutes (C27), 45 minutes (C22), 55 minutes (C21, C26, Sunday C29 trips) or 80 minutes (Saturday C29 trips).

Route Description and Service
Routes C21, C22, C26, C27 and C29 operate in central Prince George's County, Maryland connecting riders between Bowie, Kettering, Six Flags America, and Pointer Ridge to the Washington Metro. Route C21 operates during the weekday peak hours in the peak direction, routes C22 and C26 operate weekdays only, route C27 only operates between Memorial Day weekend and Labor Day weekend yearly, and route C29 operates during the weekends only. Route C29 is a combination of routes C22 and C26, and is extended to Bowie State University on Saturdays only while operating up to Pointer Ridge on Sundays.

Routes C21, C22, C27, and C29 begin at Addison Road station and follow Central Avenue before turning onto Brightseat Road, Arena Drive, Lottsford Road, Apollo Drive, and Largo Center Drive serving Downtown Largo station, where it meets with route C26. The line then runs along Largo Drive South before turning onto Harry S Truman Drive. Routes C21, C22, and C29 turn along Prince Place with route C21 turning left on Campus Way South and route C22 turning right. Route C21 then turns right onto Largo Road, then left onto Kettering Drive. Routes C22 and C29 turn back onto Harry S Truman Drive before turning onto Mount Lubentia Way, then Largo Road before following the C21 onto Kettering Drive.

Routes C26 and C27 do not turn onto Prince Place and instead turn directly onto Campus Way South. Route C27 then turns back onto Central Avenue while route C26 continues along Campus Way North until turning onto Lake Arbor Way, then onto Kettering Drive. All five routes then meet up along the intersection of Central Avenue and Kettering Drive operating parallel to each other. Routes C26 and C29 then turn onto Watkins Park Drive and operate a loop along Cambleton Drive, Whiteholm Drive, and Keverton Drive before resuming their route along Watkins Park Drive. From here route C26 follows the Saturday route C29 routing to Bowie Park & Ride Lot via Pointer Ridge, Bowie Health Center, Bowie Town Center and Bowie Gateway Center, partially replacing the suspended B29 and C28 routes.

Routes C21, C22, C26, C27, and C29 continue along Central Avenue passing Six Flags America; off-peak C22, C27, and Sunday C29 trips terminate at Pointer Ridge along Central Avenue and Hall Road before running along Hall Road and Devonwood Drive, going back to Addison Road station. Route C21 and rush hour C22 trips continue along Central Avenue before turning onto Crain Highway and serving Collington Center via Prince George's Boulevard, Commerce Drive, and Trade Zone Avenue. The two routes then operate vice versa back to Addison Road.

Saturday C29 trips run along Pointer Ridge Drive, Pittsfield Lane, Mitchellville Road, Peach Walker Drive, Mount Oak Drive, Nottinghill Drive, and Northview Drive, then turn and loop along Health Center Drive serving Bowie Health Center. The route then continues along Collington Road and Laurel Bowie Road before reaching Bowie State University. The route then operates vice versa back to Addison Road station.

Routes C21, C22, C26, C27, and C29 currently operate out of Landover division.

History
Service in Central Prince George's County, Maryland was originally operated by various Metrobus lines until the 1990s under the "T" lines. These lines connected Capitol Heights, Maryland to Downtown DC and Central Prince Georges County. But the routes were slowly eliminated or terminated at New Carrollton or Addison Road and replaced by Metrorail after 1978. Eventually, the Central Ave-Belair Line (T10, T11), and Bowie-Belair Line (T12, T14) were the main lines operating along Central Avenue.

Eventually, three lines were created to operate into Central Prince Georges County. The Pointer Ridge–Addison Road Line (C21, C22, C29), Kingsford–Addison Road Line (C23, C24, C25, and C26), and Pointer Ridge Line (C28). These lines would connect Addison Road station (C21, C22, C23, C24, C25, C26, C29) and New Carrollton station (C28) to East Kettering, Pointer Ridge (C21, C22, C29), Collington Center (C21, C22), and Bowie Town Center (C29). Route C29 would operate on the C28 routing on Saturday between Bowie Town Center and Pointer Ridge plus operate on a combination of the C22 and C26 routing.

Eventually prior to 1998, both the Central Avenue Line and Kingsford–Addison Road Line would merge into a single route. Routes C25 and C26 joined the C21, C22, and C29 while routes C23 and C24 were eliminated. The C25 and C26 routing remained the same during the merger of the routes. The line was renamed into the Central Avenue Line as a result. There was no Sunday service on any of the routes.

On September 20, 1999, route C26 buses going to Addison Road station in the morning was changed to operate westbound on Lake Arbor Way and turn south into Campus Way North.  In the afternoon, buses going to East Kettering was also changed to operate north on Campus Way North and turn right into Lake Arbor Way.

On December 18, 2004, when the Blue Line extension to Largo Town Center station opened, routes C21, C22, C26, and C29 was rerouted to serve the new station. Route C25 was eliminated while route C26 was shortened to terminate at Largo Town Center and would operate on Lake Arbor Way. From Largo, C21, C22, and C29 buses will run via Largo Drive West, Largo Center and Apollo Drives, Lottsford Road, Arena Drive, and Brightseat Road to Central Avenue and Addison Road station. C21 and C22 buses also would serve Centre Pointe Office Park on Brightseat Road. Service to Hampton Towne Centre would be eliminated.

New Sunday service was also added to route C29 but only operating between Pointer Ridge and Addison Road station as a combination to routes C22 and C26.

On May 28, 2005, a new route C27 was introduced to operate during the summer seasons between Addison Road station and Pointer Ridge via Largo Town Center station under a similar routing to the C25. Initially, the line would only operate on Saturdays between Memorial Day and Labor Day weekends, but have since expanded to daily summer service.

On March 18, 2006, route C29 was extended to serve Bowie State University from the intersection of Northview Drive and Collington Road. The current C29 routing via the Bowie Park & Ride lot and South Belair to Belair Center was discontinued due to low ridership. This routing was a combination of routes B21, B22, B24, B25, B27, B29, and B31, during the weekends except serving Addison Road station instead of New Carrollton station.

On February 23, 2018, routes C22 and C29 discontinued service along Harry S. Truman Drive south of Mount Lubentia Way due to a long-term construction project. Stops along Harry S. Truman Drive near Mount Lubentia Way, New Orchard Drive, Woodlawn Boulevard, and Birdie Lane will not be served. Customers may board buses at stops along Mount Lubentia Way near Harry S. Truman Drive. All route C22 and C29 skip the loop and instead turn left onto Mount Lubentia Way. Alternative service is provided by TheBus.

During the COVID-19 pandemic, routes C21, C22, and C26 service was suspended and route C29 operated in its place on its Saturday supplemental schedule between Addison Road and Bowie beginning on March 16, 2020. However beginning on March 18, 2020, route C29 was further reduced to operate on its Sunday schedule daily between Addison Road and Pointer Ridge with service to Bowie suspended. Weekend service was further suspended on March 21, 2020. On August 23, 2020, all route C21, C22, and C26 service was restored operating on its regular schedule while the C29 reverted to weekend only schedule. However, route C29 service to Bowie remained suspended.

In May 2020, WMATA announced that route C27 will not operate during the 2020 summer season due to the ongoing COVID-19 pandemic and Metro's reduced service since March 16, 2020. Alternative service would be provided by routes C29.

On September 10, 2020, as part of WMATA's FY2022 budget, WMATA proposed to eliminate the C29 segment between Pointer Ridge and Bowie State University on Saturday. This was due to low federal funds and proposing to eliminate all route C28 service.

Later on February 20, 2021, as part of WMATA's revised FY2022 budget during the first half, WMATA proposed to extend route C26 to Bowie Park & Ride via Bowie Gateway Center along the C28 and C29 routing along Pittsfield Lane, Mitchellville Road, Peach Walker Drive, Mount Oak Drive, Nottinghill Drive, and Northview Drive during the weekday peak hours in order to partially replace the B29 and C28. WMATA also proposed to restore Saturday C29 service to Bowie. However, in the second half, service to Bowie would be eliminated on the C26 and C29.

On June 6, 2021, all route C26 service was extended to Bowie Park & Ride via Pointer Ridge, Bowie Health Center and Bowie Gateway Center via the C28 and C29 routing in order to partially replace the B29 and C28. All route C29 service to Bowie was also restored on the same day.

References

C21